Lyman House may refer to:

in the United States
(by state, then city/town)

Lyman House (Asylum Hill, Connecticut), listed on the National Register of Historic Places (NRHP) in Hartford County
Thomas Lyman House, Durham, Connecticut, listed on the NRHP in Middlesex County
David Lyman II House, Middlefield, Connecticut, listed on the NRHP in Middlesex County
Levi and Netti Lyman House, Hilo, Hawaii, listed on the NRHP in Hawaii County
Lyman House Memorial Museum, Hilo, Hawaii, listed as the "Rev. D.B. Lyman House" on the NRHP in Hawaii County
Lyman Scott House, Summer Hill, Illinois, listed on the NRHP in Pike County
Lyman Trumbull House, Alton, Illinois, listed on the NRHP in Madison County
Lyman Estate, Waltham, Massachusetts, formerly known as "The Vale", a National Historic Landmark and listed on the NRHP in Middlesex County
Lyman Allen House and Barn, Amanda, Ohio, listed on the NRHP in Fairfield County
William Lyman House, Madison, Ohio, listed on the NRHP in Lake County
Lyman C. Joseph House, Middletown, Rhode Island, listed on the NRHP in Newport County
Wanton-Lyman-Hazard House, Newport, Rhode Island, a National Historic Landmark and listed on the NRHP in Newport County
William and Julia Lyman House, Parowan, Utah, listed on the NRHP in Iron County